Shameem Akhtar is a Bangladeshi director and screenwriter. She has made two films The Conversation (1991) and Rina Brown (2017).

Career
Shameem Ahmeed made her debut with a 10 minute long non-fiction film The Conversation, assisted by Tareque Masud. In 1993, she made another non-fiction film The Eclipse. Her film Rina Brown was released in 13 January, 13 years after her first film. The film deals with 1971's Indo-Pakistan war. She also made Kalpurush film in 2010.

References

Bangladeshi film directors
Bangladeshi women film directors
Year of birth missing (living people)
Living people